Bissell Pro Cycling Team, or simply Bissell, was an elite men's cycling team registered in the United States as a UCI Continental.  The team competed on the USA Cycling National Racing Calendar and the UCI America Tour.

The team folded at the end of the 2013 season, after Bissell withdrew sponsorship for the team, and sponsored Axel Merckx's Bissell Development Team instead.

Major wins

2005
Stage 2, Tour of Southland, Karl Menzies
Stage 5, Nature Valley Grand Prix, Richard England
2006
 United States National Under-23 Time Trial Championships, Brent Bookwalter
1st  New Zealand National Road Race Championships, Hayden Roulston
Overall,  New Zealand Cycle Classic, Hayden Roulston
Stages 3, 5, 6 & 7, Hayden Roulston
Overall,  Tour de Vineyards, Hayden Roulston
Stages 1, 2 & 3, Hayden Roulston
Overall,  Nature Valley Grand Prix, Karl Menzies
Stage 1, Nathan O'Neill
Stage 2, Greg Henderson
Stage 4, Karl Menzies
Overall,  Tour of Southland, Hayden Roulston
Stage 1, Hayden Roulston
Stage 3, Greg Henderson
Overall,  Tour of Utah, Scott Moninger
Stage 4, Scott Moninger
Mount Evans Hill Climb, Scott Moninger
Nevada City Classic, Scott Moninger
Philadelphia International Championship, Greg Henderson
Stage 1, Tour de Toona, Karl Menzies
Stage 2, Herald Sun Tour, Karl Menzies
Stage 2, Tour of the Gila, Scott Moninger
Stage 3, Tour of the Gila, Gord Fraser
Stage 4, Cascade Classic, Nathan O'Neill
2007
Tour de Leelanau, Garrett Peltonen
Chrono Champenois, Cameron Wurf
Stage 1 & 9, Tour of Southland, Tom Zirbel
Stage 2, Cascade Classic, Ben Jacques-Maynes
Stage 7, Tour of Southland, Scott Zwizanski
2008
Stage 1, Tour of Elk Grove, Tom Zirbel
Stage 3, Nature Valley Grand Prix, Ben Jacques-Maynes
Stage 3, Tour of the Gila, Tom Zirbel
Stage 5, Tour of the Gila, Burke Swindlehurst
Stage 5, Tour de Georgia, Richard England
Stage 5, Tour of Utah, Tom Zirbel
2009
 New Zealand National Time Trial Championships, Jeremy Vennell
 Points classification, Tour of Southland, Patrick Bevin
Stages 4 & 7, Patrick Bevin
 Team classification, Nature Valley Grand Prix
 Team classification, Tour of the Gila
Stage 1, Cascade Cycling Classic, Ben Jacques-Maynes
Stage 1, Tour of Elk Grove, Tom Zirbel
Stage 3, Cascade Cycling Classic, Tom Zirbel
1st Stage 6, Tour of Wellington, Jeremy Vennell
2010
 National Criterium Championships, Daniel Holloway
 Young rider classification, Tour of Utah, Ian Boswell
 Team classification, Redlands Bicycle Classic
 Team classification, Tour of Elk Grove
Nevada City Classic, Ian Boswell
Stages, 1 & 2,  Tour de Vineyards, Patrick Bevin
Stages, 2 & 3,  Sea Otter Classic, Paul Mach
Stage, 1, Sea Otter Classic, Jeremy Vennell
Stage 1, Tour of Southland, Jeremy Vennell
Stage 1,  Tour of Elk Grove, Peter Latham
2011
 National Criterium Championships, Eric Young
Overall,  Tour de Vineyards, Patrick Bevin
Stage 1, Patrick Bevin
 Mountains classification, Nature Valley Grand Prix, Kyle Wamsley
 Team classification, Nature Valley Grand Prix
 Team classification, Cascade Cycling Classic
Prologue, Tour of Southland, Jeremy Vennell
Stage 2, Tour of the Gila, Frank Pipp
Stage 8, Tour of Southland, Patrick Bevin
2012
  Points classification, Tour of the Gila, Eric Young
Stage 2, Eric Young
 Young rider classification, Cascade Cycling Classic, Carter Jones
 Mountains classification, Tour of Utah, Ben Jacques-Maynes
 Team classification, Redlands Bicycle Classic
Univest Grand Prix, Patrick Bevin
Stages 1, 2 &3, Redlands Bicycle Classic, Patrick Bevin
Stages 1 & 2, Tour of Southland, Patrick Bevin
Stage 5, Tour of Southland, Carter Jones
2013
Overall,   Sea Otter Classic, Kirk Carlsen
Stage 3, Kirk Carlsen
 Mountains classification, Tour of California, Carter Jones
 Mountains classification, Tour de Beauce, Pat McCarty
 Mountains classification, Tour of Utah, Michael Torckler
Stage 1, Cascade Cycling Classic, Phil Gaimon

Team roster
As of January 17, 2013.

References

External links
 

Defunct cycling teams based in the United States
UCI Continental Teams (America)
Cycling teams established in 2005
Cycling teams disestablished in 2013